Milton F. Burmaster (born January 19, 1905, in Milwaukee, Wisconsin) was a member of the Wisconsin State Assembly during the sessions of 1943, 1945, 1947 and 1949. Additionally, he was a Wauwatosa, Wisconsin alderman from 1937 to 1941 and President of the Wauwatosa Common Council in 1941. He was a Republican.

References

Politicians from Milwaukee
People from Wauwatosa, Wisconsin
Republican Party members of the Wisconsin State Assembly
Wisconsin city council members
1905 births
Year of death missing